James Leuzinger (born 5 May 1982) is a British alpine skier. He competed in the men's slalom at the 2006 Winter Olympics.

Personal life
Leuzinger was born in Switzerland to a British mother. He is the nephew of former England rugby player Peter Winterbottom.

References

External links
 

1982 births
Living people
British male alpine skiers
Olympic alpine skiers of Great Britain
Alpine skiers at the 2006 Winter Olympics
People from Glarus
British people of Swiss descent
Swiss people of British descent